Sharabian Rural District is in Mehraban District of Sarab County, East Azerbaijan province, Iran. At the National Census of 2006, its population was 4,378 in 1,005 households. There were 4,279 inhabitants in 1,186 households at the following census of 2011. At the most recent census of 2016, the population of the rural district was 4,083 in 1,262 households. The largest of its nine villages was Khaki, with 1,465 people.

References 

Sarab County

Rural Districts of East Azerbaijan Province

Populated places in East Azerbaijan Province

Populated places in Sarab County